Unconditional or Unconditionally may refer to:

Music

Albums
 Unconditional (Ana Popović album), 2011
 Unconditional (Clay Davidson album), 2000
 Unconditional (Memphis May Fire album), 2014

Songs
 "Unconditional", a 2011 song by Ana Popović on the album Unconditional
 "Unconditional", a 2017 song by Sinéad Harnett
 "Unconditional" (The Bravery song), a 2005 song on the album The Bravery
 "Unconditional" (Clay Davidson song), a 2000 song on the album Unconditional
 "Unconditional" (Ne-Yo song), a 2012 song by Ne-Yo on the album R.E.D.
 "Unconditional" (Ne-Yo song), a 2013 cover song by Harrison Craig on the album More Than a Dream
 "Unconditional" (Peter Andre song), a 2009 song on the album Revelation

Other uses
 Unconditional (film), a 2012 film starring Michael Ealy and Lynn Collins
 Unconditional, a play by Brett C. Leonard performed by the LAByrinth Theater Company

See also
 "Unconditionally", a 2013 song by Katy Perry
 "Unconditionally", a 1995 song by Extreme on the album Waiting for the Punchline
 "Unconditionally", a 2019 song by James Arthur on the album You